Yvonne Welbon is an American independent film director, producer, and screenwriter based in Chicago. She is known for her films, Living with Pride:Ruth C. Ellis @ 100 (1999), Sisters in Cinema (2003), and Monique (1992).

Work
Welbon attended the School of the Art Institute of Chicago for the MFA program in film and video and Northwestern University for a Ph.D, in Radio, TV, and Film.

Welbon has directed nine films and produced fifteen others. Her work has been screened on PBS, Starz/Encore, TV-ONE, IFC, Bravo, BET, the Sundance Channel and in the Toronto International Film Festival, the Sundance Film Festival, the Berlin Film Festival, and over one hundred other film festivals around the world. Living with Pride:Ruth C. Ellis @ 100 won ten best documentary awards, including the GLAAD Media Award for Outstanding Documentary. Her ongoing Sundance Documentary Fellowship project is Sisters in Cinema, a documentary, website, and forthcoming book based on her doctoral dissertation about the history of African American women feature film directors and the personal struggles they face within the industry based on their identities.

She is also working on a web based online community project, Sisters in the Life: 25 Years of Out African American Lesbian Media-making (1986-2011), which includes a collection of essays, a documentary, an archive, and a mobile app.

Welbon's producer credits include: John Pierson's Split Screen, Zeinabu Irene Davis' Mother of the River and her Sundance dramatic competition feature Compensation, Cheryl Dunye's HBO film Stranger Inside, Thomas Allen Harris' Berlin International Film Festival award-winning documentary É Minha Cara (That's My Face), Liz Miller's The Water Front, Alex Juhasz's Scale, Andrew Nisker's GERBAGE! The Revolution Starts at Home, and Catherine Crouch's One Small Step and Stray Dogs.

Biography
Having grown up as the daughter of a Chicago police officer, Welbon received an undergraduate degree in History from Vassar College. Thereafter, she spent six years in Taipei, Taiwan, where she taught English, learned Mandarin Chinese at the age of 23, and founded and published an alternative arts magazine. She ran the magazine for a total of five years.

After her return to the United States, Welbon completed a Masters of Fine Arts degree with the School of the Art Institute of Chicago and later received her PhD from Northwestern University in 2001. She also graduated from the American Film Institute's, Directing Workshop for Women.

Welbon is associate professor and department chair of the Department of Journalism and Media Studies at Bennett College for Women, an HBCU in Greensboro, North Carolina. Welbon has also been a visiting scholar at Duke University (2013-2014), and is working on a project to curate her "Sisters in Cinema" archive to allow it to become a resource for academic use.

Currently Welbon is the Interim Creative Director of Chicken and Egg Pictures and has produced a documentary, The New Black, by Yoruba Richen. She also has begun a web based community called Sisters in the Life: 25 Years of Out African American Lesbian Media-making (1986-2011).

Filmography
DirectorMonique (film) (1992)The Cinematic Jazz of Julie Dash (1992)Sisters in the Life: First Love (1993)Missing Relations (1994)Remembering Wei-Yi Fang, Remembering Myself (1996)Split Screen (TV series, 1997)Living with Pride: Ruth C. Ellis @ 100 (1999)The Taste of Dirt (2003)Sisters in Cinema (2003)

ProducerMonique (1992)Mother of the River (short, associate producer, 1995)Remembering Wei-Yi Fang, Remembering Myself (1996)Compensation (associate producer, 1999)One Small Step (1999)Living with Pride: Ruth C. Ellis @ 100 (1999)Stranger Inside (TV Movie, associate producer, 2001)That's My Face (co-producer, 2001)Stray Dogs (2002)Sisters in Cinema (2003)The Water Front (2007)Scale: Measuring Might in the Media Age (2007)Garbage! The Revolution Starts at Home (2007)The New Black'' (2013)

See also
 List of female film and television directors
 List of lesbian filmmakers
 List of LGBT-related films directed by women

References

Further reading
Ehrenstein, David. Sisters with Cameras. The Advocate, February 17, 2004.
Lindsey, Craig D. 'Sisters' gives Fascinating Insight. The News & Observer, February 6, 2004.
Moss, Marilyn. Sisters in Cinema. The Hollywood Reporter, February 6, 2004.
Sumner, Jane. Filmmaker finds 'Sisters' in cinema but not Hollywood, Dallas Morning News, February 6, 2004.
Bianco, Robert. Critics Corner- What to Watch This Weekend. USA Today. February 5, 2004.
Mertes, Cara. Yvonne Welbon: The Indies' Own Self-Help Guru, The Independent, March 2003 Koehler, Robert. Sisters in Cinema. Variety. March 11, 2003.
Merk, Ron. Be Your Own Distributor: If You Want Something Done Right..., Release Print, April 2002
"The Innovators – Featuring 117 Gay and Lesbian Trend-Breakers: Yvonne Welbon" The Advocate. August 14, 2001
Juhasz, Alexandra – Yvonne Welbon. Women of Vision: Histories in Feminist Film and Video Minneapolis: University of Minnesota Press, 2001.
"She Said Cinema: Yvonne Welbon," broadcast on the Sundance Channel, April 2001
Stein, Rob. "Living With Pride," In The Life, #904, broadcast on PBS, April/May 2000
Raab, Barbara. "The Book of Ruth," The Advocate, April 11, 2000
Graham, Renee. "Life in the Pop Lane: Inspiring 'Pride' Depicts Life of Oldest Black Lesbian," The Boston Globe, April 11, 2000
Wisco, Albert. "Yvonne Welbon at the Toronto Film Festival." Studio2, TV Ontario, broadcast November 12, 1999
Willis, Holly. "Fifty Creatives to Watch." Variety, August 23–29, 1999
Shen, Ted. "Film Explores Pride, Prejudice of a Lifestyle." The Chicago Tribune, August 26, 1999
Willis, Holly. "Twenty-Five New Faces of Indie Film." Filmmaker, Summer 1998
Redding, Judith M. and Victoria A. Brownworth "Yvonne Welbon: Memory." Film Fatales: Independent Women Directors, Seattle,WA: Seal Press, 1997, pp. 112–116.
Walker, Cary. "Rethinking the Past: Learning to Question Mainstream Perceptions" Focus, Vol. XVII, 1997, pp. 13–22.
Carter, Tammy."Soul Searching in the Far East." Times-Picayune, (New Orleans) July 28, 1996.
Mura, David. "Alternative Gazes." New Observer, (Philadelphia, PA), July 17, 1996.
Scott, Tony. "P.O.V. Remembering Wei Yi-fang..." Variety, July 29, 1996,
Shen, Ted. "Reel Life: The Kindness of Strangers," The Reader, February 2, 1996.
Miller, Cheryl. "In The Life: New Works by Black Lesbian Filmmakers." Hot Wire Vol 8, No. 3, September 1992.

External links
 
 
 Yvonne Welbon at Chicken & Egg Pictures

Living people
American film directors
American film producers
American screenwriters
American women film directors
American women film producers
American women screenwriters
African-American film directors
African-American film producers
American lesbian artists
LGBT film directors
LGBT film producers
American LGBT screenwriters
Screenwriters from North Carolina
AFI Conservatory alumni
Northwestern University alumni
School of the Art Institute of Chicago alumni
Vassar College alumni
Bennett College faculty
American women academics
21st-century African-American people
1967 births
21st-century African-American women
20th-century African-American people
20th-century African-American women